Marko Jondić (born 3 May 1995) is a Serbian footballer who plays as a midfielder for Nybergsund in the Norwegian Third Division.

On 13 February 2018, he signed for Norwegian Second Division club Elverum.

References

External links
 
 Marko Jondić Stats at utakmica.rs

1995 births
Living people
Sportspeople from Subotica
Association football midfielders
Serbian footballers
FK Spartak Subotica players
FK Palić players
Elverum Fotball players
Nybergsund IL players
Serbian SuperLiga players
Norwegian Second Division players
Norwegian Third Division players
Serbian expatriate footballers
Expatriate footballers in Norway
Serbian expatriate sportspeople in Norway